A Card from Morocco is a novel written by author and actor Robert Shaw.  It was published in 1969.  A Card from Morocco was the final novel in a trilogy, having been preceded by The Flag (1965) and The Man in the Glass Booth (1967). It concerns Arthur Lewis and Patrick Slattery, two drinking companions self-exiled from society, and their various misadventures through Spain as they both engage in bragging and self destructive behavior.

1969 British novels
Chatto & Windus books